Nazi may refer to:
 Nazi, Chaharmahal and Bakhtiari
 Nazi, Markazi